Octacanthus is a genus in the family Plantaginaceae consisting of up to 5 species which are endemic to Brazil.

Description
They are usually soft-wooded shrubs or small trees, growing at very sunny spots.

The flowers are showy and zygomorphic with big lips (labella).

Selected species
 Otacanthus caeruleus —  about 1 m (3 ft) high. The branches grow somewhat straight up, with softwood. The zygomorphic violet-blue flowers have a bended corolla with 2 cm. long lips (labella).

References 

Plantaginaceae
Plantaginaceae genera
Endemic flora of Brazil